The 2015 World Seniors Championship (Known for sponsorship reasons as the Betway World Seniors Championship) was a snooker tournament that took place between 2–3 March 2015 at the Circus Arena in Blackpool, England.

The Circus Arena played host to the tournament for the first time, having previously being held at the Mountbatten Centre in Portsmouth.

The age limit of the event was reduced from 45 to 40 years, allowing players such as Mark Williams, Peter Ebdon, Dominic Dale and Fergal O'Brien to enter. Players had to be aged 40 or above at the end of the 2015 World Championship (4 May 2015).

Steve Davis was the defending champion, but he lost 0–2 against Fergal O'Brien in the quarter-finals. Mark Williams won his 26th professional title by defeating Fergal O'Brien 2–1 in the final.

Prize fund
The breakdown of prize money for this year is shown below:
 Winner: £18,000
 Runner-up: £8,000
 Semi-finalist: £4,000
 Quarter-finalist: £2,000
 Last 16: £1,000
 Total: £50,000

Main draw
The draw for the last 16 was made on 3 December 2014 at the Barbican Centre in York during the UK Championship. All former World Seniors Champions and World Snooker Champions, who registered for the event, were seeded through to the final stages in Blackpool. There were three century breaks during the tournament. Mark Williams made a 140 break against Darryn Walker and Fergal O'Brien made a 110 and 105 break against Peter Ebdon.

Final

Qualifying
These matches were played on 20 and 21 December 2014 at the Robin Park Arena, Sports and Tennis Centre in Wigan, England. There were two century breaks during the qualifying. Dominic Dale made a 129 break against Peter Delaney and Rory McLeod made a 104 break against Andrew Milliard.

Centuries

Main stage centuries

 140  Mark Williams
 110, 105  Fergal O'Brien

Qualifying stage centuries

 129  Dominic Dale

References

2015
2015 in snooker
2015 in English sport
Sport in Blackpool
2010s in Lancashire